Acinetobacter pittii is a Gram-negative, oxidase-negative, catalase-positive, strictly aerobic, nonmotile, diplococcoid rod bacterium from the genus Acinetobacter. DNA-DNA hybridization studies have been used to identify DNA groups (genomic species) within the genus Acinetobacter and A. pittii belongs to the Acinetobacter calcoaceticus-baumannii complex. The specific epithet pittii is named after the British microbiologist Tyrone Pitt.

Bacteria of the genus Acinetobacter are ubiquitously distributed in nature. They are found in various types of soils and waters and are occasionally found in foodstocks. They are normal inhabitants of human skin and are capable of transitory colonization of the upper respiratory tract. They can cause infection in debilitated patients.

References

External links
 Type strain of Acinetobacter pittii at BacDive – the Bacterial Diversity Metadatabase

Moraxellaceae
Bacteria described in 2011